Wolves is the debut studio album by Scottish indie rock band My Latest Novel, released on 6 March 2006 on Bella Union/The Worker's Institute. The album is entitled Wolves due to the collaborative nature of the band; vocalist and guitarist Gary Deveney states that the band "write like a pack."

Recording
According to guitarist and vocalist Chris Deveney, the recording process:

Song information
According to vocalist and guitarist Gary Deveney, "The Reputation of Ross Francis" is based on a friend of the band:

Track listing
"Ghost in the Gutter" – 6:32
"Pretty in a Panic" – 4:19
"Learning Lego" – 4:30
"The Hope Edition" – 4:48
"The Job Mr. Kurtz Done" – 3:23
"Sister Sneaker Sister Soul" – 6:00
"When We Were Wolves" – 4:13
"Wrongfully, I Rested" – 4:43
"Boredom Killed Another" – 4:49
"The Reputation of Ross Francis" – 2:59

References

External links
 My Latest Novel's official site
 Bella Union
 The Worker's Institute

2006 debut albums
My Latest Novel albums
Bella Union albums